Connie is a given name. It is often a pet form (hypocorism) of Concetta, Constance, Cornelia, or Cornelius.

Given name or nickname

Women 
 Connie Achurra, Chilean chef
 Connie Binsfeld (1924–2014), American politician
 Connie Booth (born 1944), American actress and writer, former wife of John Cleese
 Connie Britton (born 1967), American actress, singer and producer
 Connie Brockway (born 1954), American historical and romance novelist
 Connie Carpenter-Phinney (born 1957), American retired cyclist and speed skater
 Connie Chung (born 1946), American journalist
 Constance Clayton (born 1933), American educator and civic leader
 Connie Constance (born 1995), British singer and songwriter
 Connie Conway (born 1950), American politician
 Connie Desmond (1908–1983), American baseball sportscaster
 Connie Dierking (1936–2013), American Basketball League and National Basketball Association player
 Connie Egan, Northern Irish politician
 Connie Fisher (born 1983), Northern Irish-born Welsh actress and singer
 Connie Gilchrist (1901–1985), American actress
 Connie Gilchrist, Countess of Orkney (1865–1946), British child artist's model, actress, dancer, and singer
 Connie Hansen (born 1964), Danish Paralympian
 Connie Hedegaard (born 1960), Danish politician
 Connie Laliberte, Canadian curler, 1984 world champion
 Connie Lawson (born 1949), American politician, Indiana Secretary of State
 Connie Lewcock (1894–1980), British suffragette, arsonist and socialist
 Connie Meijer (1963–1988), Dutch cyclist
 Connie Mitchell (born c. 1977), South African-born Australian singer-songwriter also known as Miss Connie
 Connie Morrison, American politician and businesswoman
 Connie Nielsen (born 1965), Danish actress
 Connie Norman (1949–1996), American AIDS and trans rights activist
 Connie Price-Smith (born 1962), American former shot putter and discus thrower
 Connie Ramsay (born 1988), Scottish judoka
 Connie Ruth (born 1944), American politician
 Connie Schultz (born 1957), American writer, Pulitzer Prize-winning journalist and columnist
 Connie Sison (born 1975), Filipina journalist
 Connie Talbot (born 2000), English child singer, finalist in the first series of Britain's Got Talent
 Connie Willis (born 1945), American science fiction and fantasy writer

Men 
 Connie Brown (1917–1966), Canadian National Hockey League player
 Connie Dion (1918–2014), Canadian National Hockey League player
 Connie B. Gay (1914–1989), American country music talent scout/manager, owner of radio and television stations and music executive
 Connie Grob (1932–1997), American baseball player
 Connie Hawkins (1942–2017), American Basketball League, National Basketball Association and American Basketball Association player and Harlem Globetrotter
 Connie Johnson (baseball) (1922–2004), American pitcher in the Negro leagues and Major League Baseball
 Connie Keane (born 1930), Irish hurler in the 1950s
 Connie Kelly (born 1949), Irish retired hurler
 L. William O'Connell (1890–1985), American cinematographer
 Connie Mack (1862–1956), American Major League Baseball player, manager and team owner
 Connie Mack III, American politician and attorney, grandson of Connie Mack
 Connie Mack IV, American politician, son of the above
 Connie Murphy (1870–1945), American Major League Baseball catcher
 Connie Sheehan, Irish hurler in the 1910s and '20s
 Connie Simmons (1925–1989), American National Basketball Association player
 Connie Zelencik (1955–2021), American football player

Stage or pen name 
 Connie Deka and Connie Lane, pen names of Constance Laux (born 1952), American romance novelist
 Connie Francis (born 1938), American singer Concetta Rosa Maria Franconero
 Connie Glynn (born 1994), English YouTuber and author Constance Ella Glynn
 Connie Kay (1927–1994), American jazz drummer born Conrad Henry Kirnon
 Connie Sellecca (born Concetta Sellecchia in 1955), American actress, producer and former model
 Connie Smith (born 1941), American country music singer and songwriter born Constance June Meador
 Connie Stevens (born 1938), American actress and singer Concetta Rosalie Ann Ingoglia
 Connie (freestyle singer), American singer Consuelo Piriz
 Connie (Burmese singer), Burmese singer born Yadana Tun

Fictional characters 
 Connie, portrayed by Stephanie Beacham in the homonymous 1985 British television drama series Connie
 Constance "Connie" Beauchamp, from the BBC medical dramas Holby City and Casualty
 Connie Blair, heroine of 12 mystery novels for adolescent girls written by Betty Cavanna
 Constance "Connie" Brooks (see Our Miss Brooks), fictional English language teacher
 Connie Clayton, from the soap opera Coronation Street
 Connie Corleone, played by Talia Shire in The Godfather movie trilogy
 Connie D'Amico, a supporting character and rival of Meg Griffin from the television series Family Guy
 Connie Falconeri, one of two personalities of the character Kate Howard from the soap opera General Hospital
 Connie Kendall, from the radio series Adventures in Odyssey
 Connie Kurridge, the titular character of Connie, a newspaper comic strip created by Frank Godwin
 Connie Maheswaran, a supporting character from the television series Steven Universe
 Connie Rubirosa, a character of Law & Order, an Assistant District Attorney, portrayed by Alana De La Garza
 Connie Sachs, from the Karla Trilogy spy novels by John le Carré
 Kahn Jr. "Connie" Souphanousinphone, a supporting character from the television series King of the Hill.
 Connie Springer, a supporting character from the anime/manga series Attack on Titan
 Connie Thompson (nicknamed "Creepy Connie"), from the Disney television series Jessie
 Connie, the titular character of Connie the Cow (La Vaca Connie), a Spanish children's television series
 Connie, the main character of "Where Are You Going, Where Have You Been?", a short story by Joyce Carol Oates
 Connie Marble, portrayed by Mink Stole in Pink Flamingos, a movie by John Waters

Animals
 Koni (dog), Vladimir Putin's dog, also known as Connie

See also
 Konnie Huq (born 1975), British television presenter
 Conny, a given name or surname (including a list of persons with the name)
 Kalitta Air, callsign "Connie"

English unisex given names
Unisex given names
Hypocorisms
Lists of people by nickname